An election to the Neath Rural District Council in West Glamorgan, Wales was held on 8 May 1958. It was preceded by the 1955 election, and followed by the 1961 election.

Overview of the results
A Labour stronghold for over twenty years, the position remained more or less the same as a result of the election, with the most notable feature being the defeat of the last Communist councillor. Over half of the wards saw Labour candidates returned unopposed.

Candidates
The profile of candidates was similar to three years previously with a number of long-serving Labour councillors returned unopposed.

Outcome
As noted there were very few changes, with Labour gaining a seat from the Communists and losing another, at Glyn-neath, to an Independent candidate who headed the poll.

Ward results

Baglan Higher (one seat)

Blaengwrach (one seats)

Blaenrhonddan, Bryncoch Ward (one seat)

Blaenrhonddan, Cadoxton Ward (one seat)

Blaenrhonddan, Cilfrew Ward (one seat)

Clyne (one seats)

Coedffranc (five seats)

Dyffryn Clydach (two seats)

Dulais Higher, Crynant Ward (one seat)

Dulais Higher, Onllwyn Ward (one seat)

Dulais Higher, Seven Sisters Ward (two seats)

Dulais Lower (one seat)

Michaelstone Higher (one seat)

Neath Higher (three seats)

Neath Lower (one seat)

Resolven, Cwmgwrach Ward (one seat)

Resolven, Resolven Ward (two seats)

Resolven, Rhigos Ward (two seats)

Resolven, Tonna Ward (one seat)

References

1958 Welsh local elections